Serranopsis is an extinct genus of prehistoric ray-finned fish belonging to the family Serranidae, the sea basses and groupers. The only known species in the genus is Serranopsis londinensis which was found in Ypresian marine claystone of the London Clay Formation on the Isle of Sheppey in the United Kingdom.

References

External links

Serranidae
Prehistoric perciform genera
Eocene fish of Europe